The Women's lightweight double sculls competition at the 2012 Summer Olympics in London took place are at Dorney Lake which, for the purposes of the Games venue, is officially termed Eton Dorney.

Schedule

All times are British Summer Time (UTC+1)

Results

Heats
First two of each heat qualify to the semifinals, remainder goes to the repechage.

Heat 1

Heat 2

Heat 3

Repechage
First three qualify to the semifinal.

Repechage 1

Repechage 2

Semifinals A/B

Semifinal 1

Semifinal 2

Finals

Final C

Final B

Final A

References

Women's lightweight double sculls
Women's lightweight double sculls